Maisto is a brand of scale model vehicles introduced and owned by May Cheong Group, a Chinese company founded in 1967 in Hong Kong by brothers P.Y. Ngan and Y.C Ngan. The company has also subsidiaries in the United States (based in Fontana, California), France, and China. MCG also owns other model car brands such as Italian former company Bburago (acquired assets and right to brand in 2006) and Polistil.

The company has also manufactured a number of Tonka products under license from Hasbro. Products under the Maisto brand includes die-cast scale model cars.

Company history 

The company was established in Hong Kong in 1967 as "May Cheong Toy Company" by brothers P.Y. Ngan and Y.C Ngan. Products were initially commercialised under the "MC Toy" (using the initials of the company) brand. 

Some of the first MC Toys products were direct copies of Matchbox cars, although the firm had original designs as well. Soon after, European cars were added to its range of products. MC produced European models not made by Matchbox or Hot Wheels, and the brand became popular helped by its cheap prices.

In the late 1980s, MC Toys' vehicles increased their qualify, becoming more realistic and accurate to real models, in contrast with other counterpart companies that produced toy-ike cars. In 1990, the company introduced the "Maisto" brand of diecast cars. Through the 1990s, Maisto was considered the US division of Master Toy Co. Ltd. of Thailand with May Cheong being the Kowloon, Hong Kong, subsidiary.

The May Cheong Group products are made in China and Thailand. The factories in China and Thailand manufacture 1:12, 1:18, 1:24, 1:25, 1:27, 1:43, 1:31 and 1:64 scale replicas. Most models are officially licensed products, based on popular vehicles. Others, however, are fantastical rod and custom creations more in line with the Hot Wheels formula. The US warehouse and distribution center, aka Maisto International, Inc, is located in Fontana, California.

In 2006 the May Cheong Group acquired the assets of the famous Italian brand Bburago. Later, the firm also obtained the Polistil name, another well-known Italian scale model manufacturer that had previously gone bankrupt.

Automobiles 
Maisto gained popularity around 1988, mainly competing in 1:18 scale with Italian Bburago, Polistil and the more expensive –and often more spotty– Franklin Mint Precision Models. By 2000, a whole host of companies like Yatming, Ertl, and even Mattel's  Hot Wheels had entered the larger scale 1:18 fray. Especially since Bburago failed (being now a part of May Cheong itself), no other company overall has been able to compete with Maisto at the larger scale, except perhaps Jada Toys. Even so, the 1:18 scale market is not as prevalent as it was. Circa 2010, 1:24 is still popular, but the larger scales have waned in retail stores.

Maisto vehicles of 1/18 scale usually have all features open with nicely appointed engines and interiors. Models have nearly perfectly proportioned bodies and usually have excellently researched detail considering models are mass-produced in the hundreds of thousands. Still, paint application may be too thick or not uniform, and details that should be chrome are often painted silver. Body panels may be uneven, lights unrealistic, and trim rather thick and gaudy. Muscle Machines magazine noted that the 1963 Dodge 330 Hemi was completely devoid of any indication of a gear shift of any type (even push button on the dash). Collectors wanting finer crafting in this size must look to AUTOart, CMC, or Exoto at the higher dollar end of miniature modeling.

1/64 scale Maisto die-cast models are comparable in quality and details to Matchbox, Hot Wheels and Johnny Lightning, but new models in this scale are not released very often. Even some models use similar castings from older Matchbox and Hot Wheels models. Newer lines offer vehicles in more customized themes. One such line is the AllStarz which features custom rims, special paint jobs, lowered suspension and super upgraded in-car entertainment systems. Another line is Pro Rodz which uses the same themes but consists of classic American muscle cars. Both lines are in direct competition with 'Jada Toys' 'Dub City' and 'Big Time Muscle' brands that started the 'bling' trends in auto toys.

Around late 2010, Maisto toys sold in Wal-Mart stores took on the name 'Adventure Wheels' on all Maisto packaging with red-orange and yellow gold box and blister pack colors with black trim.

Maisto produces many licensed properties that reflected contemporary promotional and industry trends. For example, it is an official licensee of Harley-Davidson Motorcycle Company. Chrysler is a big user of Maisto for promo models - one example was the offering of three different versions of the PT Cruiser (stock, sport and panel) made available first to auto journalists, but later sold normally in Walmart and other stores.  The brand was popularly seen in Sam's Club until about 2010.

Lines

Vehicles

 Exclusive Edition- Higher end vehicle range featuring extra levels of detail. These include photo-etched badges, extra coats of paint, and finer painted details in the interior and engine bay
 Special Edition - Mid-range vehicle replicas. 1:18 scale models are mounted on plastic display stand.
 Premiere Edition - Vehicle replicas with clear plastic casing over display stand. No real quality difference over Special Edition. 
 Assembly Line - Ready-to-build diecast vehicles. Includes Ferrari models.
 GT Racing - Replicas of race cars from the Deutsche Tourenwagen Masters (German Touring Car Championship) and 24 Hours of Le Mans series.
 AllStars - Scale replica 'bling' vehicles with lowered suspension, larger wheels, custom interiors and special paint jobs. Formerly marketed as Playerz.
 AllStars Red - Target-exclusive lineup, which consists of 100 different models.
 Pro Rodz - American muscle cars with custom wheels, interior and paint jobs. Some 1:18 and 1:24 models are also available as assembly kits.
 Pro Rodz Pro Street - American muscle cars modified with larger engines and thicker tires for drag racing.
 TLUGZ - 1:24 scale plastic vehicles with 2½" block character figures.
 Hummer World - Maisto's exclusive lineup of Hummer vehicles.
 Muscle Machines - 1/18,1/24 and 1/64 scale first produced by Funline in 1999, then taken over by Maisto.  Cartoonish, but accurately detailed rods with bloated wheels and large engines.
 Show Stoppers - 1:18 scale set that includes a towing vehicle, a trailer, and a vehicle being towed.

Motorcycles, bicycles, and aircraft

 Motorcycles - Lineup consists of Harley-Davidson official licensed products, MotoGP racers, Vespa scooters, stock motorcycles and the Dodge Tomahawk Concept Bike.
 Wild Rides - Custom choppers with matching helmets.
 Tour de Maisto - 1:12 scale replica bicycles.
 Fresh Metal - Tailwinds - 1:87 die-cast historic and modern-era military helicopters and airplanes. Plastic stand with aircraft name included. Also some ~1:550 scale diecast airliners.
 Tow and Show - 1:18 scale motorcycle and motorcycle trailer sets.  Consists of Harley-Davidson official licensed motorcycles.

Railroad
Maisto On Track - A variety of railroad engines and rail cars in N scale.
Maisto Power On Track - .

Smaller scale
 Tonka Classic - Replicas of classic Tonka vehicles.
 Chuck & Friends - 3" cartoon vehicles that are part of the Tonka Collection.
 Fresh Metal - Power Racers - 4.5" die-cast vehicles with pull-back motors.
 Gascaps - Super-deformed vehicles, similar to Jada Toys' Chub City line.
 Need for Speed: Undercover - Promotional die-cast for Need for Speed: Undercover game. Each car has a cheat code to unlock the in-game version of the car.

Radio-controlled vehicles
 Custom R/C Shop - Radio-controlled versions of AllStars and Pro Rodz vehicles.
 Street Troopers: Mobilized Attack Vehicles - R/C vehicles that can transform into attack modes and fire foam projectiles.
 Monster Drift RC - R/C vehicles with hard plastic tires and 4 wheel drive, optimized for drifting.

See also
 Bburago
 Polistil

References 
 

Footnotes

External links

 

Toy brands
Companies based in San Bernardino County, California
Toy companies established in 1967
Model manufacturers of China
Toy cars and trucks
Die-cast toys
1:18 scale models
1:25 scale models
Model manufacturers of the United States